Derrie Fakhoury (1930–2015) was a Lebanese artist.

Life

Fakhoury was born in Beirut in 1930, and studied painting at the Fine Arts Academy in Beirut. She traveled to Italy to continue her studies in art at the Accademia di belle arti di Roma. Then she joined the Institute of Medal Art of Rome and she excelled in this area. Inspired by her visits to churches and museums in Italy, she studied the art of wall painting (Fresco) at the Decorative Arts Institute and became proficient in this art. After returning from Italy, She lived with her husband, the late famous Syrian painter and plastic artist Mahmoud Hammad in Damascus and produced works in various aspects of art with clear talent. Her work recorded themes inspired by the rural environment characterized by transparent colors and sincere impressionism.

References

1930 births
Artists from Beirut
2015 deaths
20th-century Lebanese painters
Lebanese women artists
20th-century women artists
Lebanese women painters